Chhime Rigzing, also Chhime Rigzin Chhoekyapa, is a Tibetan government official and senior spokesman for Tenzin Gyatso, the 14th Dalai Lama. He functions as a private secretary and is part of the Central Tibetan Administration in exile in Dharamsala in India.

He was Representative of the Dalai Lama and the Government in Exile to Central and Eastern Europe, as head of the Geneva Tibet Bureau, from 27 August 2001 to 15 September 2005.

References

Tibetan politicians
Living people
Year of birth missing (living people)
People from Dharamshala
Central Tibetan Administration